Rebamipide, an amino acid derivative of 2-(1H)-quinolinone, is used for mucosal protection, healing of gastroduodenal ulcers, and treatment of gastritis. It works by enhancing mucosal defense, scavenging free radicals, and temporarily activating genes encoding cyclooxygenase-2.

Studies have shown that rebamipide can fight the damaging effects of NSAIDs on the GIT mucosa,  and more recently, the small intestine, but not for naproxen-induced gastric damage.

Availability
Rebamipide is used in a number of Asian countries including Japan (marketed as Mucosta), South Korea, China and India (where it is marketed under the trade name Rebagen). It is also approved in Russia under the brand name Rebagit.

References 

Amino acids
2-Quinolones
Benzamides
Chloroarenes